The High Uintas Wilderness  is a wilderness area located in northeastern Utah, United States. The wilderness covers the Uinta Mountains, encompassing parts of Duchesne and Summit counties. Designated as a wilderness in 1984, the area is located within parts of Ashley National Forest and Uinta-Wasatch-Cache National Forest, managed by the U.S. Forest Service.

Mirror Lake Highway is closed in the winter, usually opening annually near Memorial Day.  Winter access is allowed for snowmobiling (though snowmobiling is not allowed within the Wilderness Area), cross-country skiing, and snowshoeing.

In popular culture 
Despite being filmed in Canada, the area is specifically referred to in, and the setting for most of, the 2017 film The Mountain Between Us.

See also 
 Ashley National Forest
 Uinta Highline Trail
 List of U.S. Wilderness Areas
 National Wilderness Preservation System
 Uinta-Wasatch-Cache National Forest
 Wilderness Act

References

Further reading 

 Lynna P. Howard, Utah's Wilderness Areas: The Complete Guide (Westcliffe Publishers, 2005) 
 Bill Cunningham & Polly Burke, Wild Utah: A Guide to 45 Roadless Recreation Areas (Falcon Publishing, 1998) 
 Jeffrey Probst & Brad Probst, High Uintas Backcountry: A Guide and Trip Planner (Outland Publishing, 1996) 
 Mel Davis & John Veranth, High Uinta Trails (Wasatch Publishers, 1993) 
 Philip L. Fradkin, Sagebrush Country: Land and the American West (The University of Arizona Press, 1989)

External links 

 

Ashley National Forest
Features of the Uinta Mountains
IUCN Category Ib
Protected areas of Duchesne County, Utah
Protected areas of Summit County, Utah
Wasatch-Cache National Forest
Wilderness areas of Utah
Protected areas established in 1984
1984 establishments in Utah